Avezzano Calcio Ar. L. is an Italian association football club located in Avezzano, Abruzzo.

History 
The club was founded in 1919 and refounded in 1998 and 2009. In 1996–1997 it played in Serie C1, the highest level reached by the team.

Nuova Avezzano 
Following financial problems, in 2009 Nuova Avezzano Calcio tried to merge with the newly promoted to Serie C2 A.S. Pescina Valle del Giovenco. When the merging was denied by the Lega Calcio Serie C, the club folded and sold its sport rights to A.S.D. Luco Canistro. In 2010/2011 Pescina, that is playing in Avezzano's pitch since his field is ineligible for Lega Pro, will be anyway renamed into Avezzano Valle del Giovenco.

The refoundation 
In 2009 the club was refounded as A.S.D. Avezzano Foce Nuova that in the season 2010–11 was promoted to Promozione Abruzzo. In the summer 2011 it eas renamed with the current name. The team plays in the serie D.

Colors and badge 
Its colors are white and green. The logo has to center the wolf Marsicano.

Honours 
 Coppa Italia Dilettanti
 Champions: 1986–87 (as Avezzano Calcio)

Notable players 
Player with 100 appearances
 Alessandro Del Grosso
Italy internationals
 Giuseppe Pancaro

References

External links 
 Avezzano Calcio

 
Football clubs in Italy
Association football clubs established in 1919
Serie C clubs
1919 establishments in Italy